Filistata is a genus of crevice weavers that was first described by Pierre André Latreille in 1810.

Species
 it contains 14 species that occur mainly from Eurasia and the Canary Islands, with one species found in Cape Verde:
Filistata albens Zonstein & Marusik, 2019 – Israel
Filistata balouchi Zamani & Marusik, 2020 – Iran
Filistata betarif (Magalhaes, Aharon, Ganem & Gavish-Regev, 2022) – Israel
Filistata canariensis Schmidt, 1976 – Canary Is.
Filistata gomerensis Wunderlich, 1992 – Canary Is.
Filistata hasselti Simon, 1906 – Indonesia (Java?)
Filistata insidiatrix (Forsskål, 1775) (type) – Cape Verde Is., Mediterranean to Turkmenistan
Filistata lehtineni Marusik & Zonstein, 2014 – Azerbaijan, Iran
Filistata lubinae Zonstein & Marusik, 2019 – Israel
Filistata maguirei Marusik & Zamani, 2015 – Iran
Filistata pseudogomerensis Wunderlich, 1992 – Canary Is.
Filistata pygmaea Zonstein, Marusik & Grabolle, 2018 – Portugal
Filistata teideensis Wunderlich, 1992 – Canary Is.
Filistata wunderlichi Zonstein & Marusik, 2019 – Spain

References

Araneomorphae genera
Cosmopolitan spiders
Filistatidae
Taxa named by Pierre André Latreille